The Last Rebel is a 1958 Mexican western film directed and written by Miguel Contreras Torres. It stars Carlos Thompson as Joaquin Murrieta, Ariadna Welter and Rodolfo Acosta. The film was produced by Hispano Continental Films.

References

External links

Mexican Western (genre) films
1958 Western (genre) films
1958 films
Films directed by Miguel Contreras Torres
1950s Mexican films